The Marshall Chess Club, in Greenwich Village, New York City, is one of the oldest chess clubs in the United States. The club was formed in 1915 by a group of players led by Frank Marshall. It is a nonprofit organization and a gold affiliate of the United States Chess Federation.

History
The Marshall Chess Club was a long-time rival of the Manhattan Chess Club, a club which existed from 1877 to 2002. The Marshall Chess Club  met in  several temporary homes until it moved permanently to 23 West Tenth Street in 1931. The club occupies two floors of a townhouse at that address and owns the building.

Marshall was the leader of the club until his death in 1944, when his wife Caroline took over its leadership.

Some notable members of the club have been Fabiano Caruana, Arthur Dake, Larry Evans, Reuben Fine, Bobby Fischer, Stanley Kubrick, Edmar Mednis, Hikaru Nakamura, Fred Reinfeld, Anthony Santasiere, Herbert Seidman, James Sherwin, Albert Simonson, Andy Soltis, Sam Sloan, and Howard Stern. Marcel Duchamp, a modern artist associated with the Dada and Surrealist movements, played for the club after moving to Greenwich Village in the 1940s; his photograph hangs on a wall of the club.

Tournaments

The club has been the site of several rounds of the U.S. Chess Championship. Bobby Fischer played in the 1965 Capablanca Memorial Tournament being held in Havana, Cuba via Teletype from the club with the board being there as well. The Game of the Century also was played there, in 1956 between Bobby Fischer and Donald Byrne. The chess table used for the 2016 World Chess Championship is also in the club and is used as the "top board" in many tournaments.

Daily tournaments are run at the club for both nonmembers and members ranging from weekly blitz tournaments to regular play where games are usually held once a week or over a weekend. These events range from beginner events to FIDE titled events with several titled players. Club members can attend lectures, movie nights, members only tournaments, and a variety of other activities. They also pay less for other events and are entitled to stay at the club when tournaments are not happening on free nights. Notable events yearly include the Marshall International where Grandmaster and International Master norms can be obtained as well as their local club championship with both a titled section and an under 2300 section for untitled players. More recently, the Marshall has switched to an online interface used for tournament registration and for entering results with a small fee for registering late.

References

External links
 Marshall Chess Club website

Chess clubs in the United States
1915 in chess
Sports clubs established in 1915
Sports in Manhattan
Greenwich Village
1915 establishments in New York City